Hoseynali Beyglu (also Romanized as Ḩoseyn‘alī Beyglū and Ḩoseyn ‘Alī-ye Beyglū) is a village in Bastamlu Rural District, in the Central District of Khoda Afarin County, East Azerbaijan Province, Iran. At the 2006 census, its population was 137, in 30 families.

References 

Populated places in Khoda Afarin County